Glatz may refer to: 

 Glatz (district) (1816–1945), a Prussian district in Silesia
 Glatz Land, a historical region in southwestern Poland
 County of Kladsko (1459–1818), in the Kingdom of Bohemia and, later, the Kingdom of Prussia
 Glatz (city), the German name of Kłodzko, Poland, and capital city of the historic county
 Glatz (surname)

See also
 Glatze, a low-scoring playing card